Ptichodis is a genus of moths in the family Erebidae. The genus was erected by Jacob Hübner in 1818.

Species
 Ptichodis agrapta (Hampson, 1913)
 Ptichodis basilans (Guenée, 1852)
 Ptichodis bistriga (Herrich-Schäffer, 1869)
 Ptichodis bistrigata Hübner, 1818
 Ptichodis bucetum Grote, 1883
 Ptichodis fasciata (E. D. Jones, 1921)
 Ptichodis herbarum Guenée, 1852
 Ptichodis immunis Guenée, 1852
 Ptichodis infecta (Walker, 1858)
 Ptichodis ovalis Grote, 1883
 Ptichodis pacalis Walker, 1858
 Ptichodis surrufula (Dyar, 1913)
 Ptichodis vinculum Guenée, 1852

References

 
 

 
Euclidiini
Moth genera